Discovery Channel Southeast Asia (known as The Discovery Channel from 1985 to 1995, often referred to as simply Discovery) is the Southeast Asian version of Discovery Channel operated by Warner Bros. Discovery Asia-Pacific, a division of Warner Bros. Discovery, a publicly traded company run by CEO David Zaslav.

References

Southeast Asia
Mass media in Southeast Asia
English-language television stations
Television channels and stations established in 1995
Television channel articles with incorrect naming style